Dorohusk  is a village in Chełm County, Lublin Voivodeship, in southeastern Poland, at the border with Ukraine. It is the seat of the gmina (administrative district) called Gmina Dorohusk.

The village has a population of 517.

The landmark of Dorohusk is the Suchodolski Palace, a Baroque palace built by the Suchodolski family in the 18th century.

References

Holocaust locations in Poland
Kholm Governorate
Lublin Voivodeship (1919–1939)
Poland–Ukraine border crossings
Villages in Chełm County